Marcel Bout (born 18 November 1962) is a Dutch football coach and scout. Bout has worked with Feyenoord, FC Volendam, AZ Alkmaar, SC Telstar, FC Bayern Munich, Manchester United and the Netherlands national football team in various coaching and advisory roles in the past.

Biography
Bout previously worked as a head training coach, youth team coach and recovery trainer at Feyenoord (1995–2004) and assistant coach, head of youth and chief scout at Volendam (2004–2006), and was the manager of the AZ second team Jong AZ from 2006 to 2009. In 2010, he took over as head coach of the SC Telstar senior team from Edward Metgod, before joining Louis van Gaal as an assistant at FC Bayern Munich in 2011. Bout previously worked with Van Gaal at AZ (where they won the Dutch Eredivisie in 2009), and following the departure of Van Gaal from Bayern Munich in 2011, Bout continued to work at Bayern Munich, serving as assistant manager alongside interim head coach Andries Jonker. Bout was retained by new Bayern Munich manager Jupp Heynckes, and became the chief match analyst at the club. He left Germany in 2012 to become an assistant coach, technical analyst and scout with the Netherlands national under-21 football team. 

Bout joined Louis van Gaal at Manchester United in the summer of 2014, becoming the assistant coach specialising in opposition scouting. He was named chief global scout in October 2016 and left his role in April 2022.

References

1962 births
Living people
Sportspeople from Haarlem
Dutch football managers
Feyenoord non-playing staff
FC Volendam non-playing staff
FC Bayern Munich non-playing staff
Manchester United F.C. non-playing staff
Dutch expatriate sportspeople in England
SC Telstar managers
Association football coaches
Association football scouts